Phantom is a 1922 German romantic fantasy film directed by F. W. Murnau. It is an example of German Expressionist film and has a surreal, dreamlike quality.

Plot
The film is told in an extended flashback. Lorenz Lubota (Alfred Abel), is a clerk in a minor government office, an aspiring poet, and a member of a family headed by a worrisome mother who has a tense relationship with a daughter, Melanie, whom the mother believes works as a prostitute.  One day, while Lorenz is walking to work,  a woman (Lya De Putti) driving two white horses hits him in the road, knocking him to the ground.  Physically, he is unharmed, but from that point forward, the woman in the carriage (named Veronika) consumes his every thought.

His obsession with Veronika costs him his job when he fails to show up for work and threatens his boss for accusing him of stalking her.  Believing his poems will be published and anticipating a meeting with a publisher, Lorenz asks his Aunt Schwabe (Grete Berger)—a cutthroat pawnbroker—for money to buy a new suit.  Schwabe's assistant, Wigottschinski (Anton Edthofer), encourages Lorenz to celebrate and they reunite with Lorenz's sister, who becomes Wigottschinski's girlfriend.  Unable to contact Veronika, who is wealthy and engaged to someone of her own class, Lorenz instead begins courting a golddigger who looks like Veronika (also played by Lya De Putti), lavishing her with expensive things, all the while reliving the day he was run over in his mind again and again.  In the meantime Lorenz's mother's health begins to deteriorate due to her worries over her son's and her daughter's actions, and Lorenz's friend Marie (Lil Dagover) and her father learn that Lorenz's poems will not be published after all.

Wigottschinski swindles more money out of Schwabe and gives Lorenz a sizable amount. However, Aunt Schwabe becomes suspicious and discovers that Lorenz will not be a published poet, and she angrily demands that he pay back the money after three days or else she will notify the police.  Desperate, Lorenz agrees to Wigottschinski's plan to break into her house after she has gone to sleep and to steal enough money to pay back the loan. She wakes up and discovers them, running to the window to call for the police. A struggle ensues, and Wigottschinski kills her, while Melanie runs off and eventually briefly reunites with her mother before disappearing.

Lorenz is arrested and sent to prison. After his release, the film returns to the present, where Lorenz is finishing writing his life story down, in an attempt to purge his mind from the phantom woman who continually hits him in her carriage.  Lorenz also now has a new life with Marie.

Cast
In alphabetical order

Reception

Author and film critic Leonard Maltin awarded the film three out of a possible four stars, calling the film "[a] poetic psychodrama".

Preservation status
The film was thought to be a lost film for many years, but was restored by German film archivists and re-released in the USA on 12 September 2006.

See also
 1922 in film
 German Expressionism

References

External links
 
 
 

1922 films
1920s romantic fantasy films
German black-and-white films
Films based on German novels
Films based on works by Gerhart Hauptmann
Films directed by F. W. Murnau
Films of the Weimar Republic
German Expressionist films
German silent feature films
Films with screenplays by Thea von Harbou
1920s rediscovered films
Films produced by Erich Pommer
German romantic fantasy films
UFA GmbH films
Rediscovered German films
1920s German films